Hymenocallis tubiflora is a plant species from Trinidad and northern South America. It is reported from Trinidad, Venezuela, Guyana, Suriname, French Guiana, and northern Brazil. The name was originally coined in 1812, the description based on a specimen grown at Kew Botanical Garden in London, the bulb having been seized by British sailors from a French ship captured by the Royal Navy in 1803.

Hymenocallis tubiflora is a bulb-forming perennial. It has broadly lanceolate leaves up to 60 cm long, tapering at the tip and narrowing below to a long petiole. Flowers are white, borne in an umbel; tepals long and narrow, frequently drooping at flowering time; staminal cup short. Anthers yellow, borne on long filaments.

Gardening
The species is widely cultivated in tropical countries because of its attractive, fragrant floral display. It is reported naturalized in Malaysia. It can also be grown in temperate countries with proper care and protection from cold weather.

References

tubiflora
Flora of South America
Flora of Trinidad and Tobago
Garden plants
Plants described in 1812
Flora without expected TNC conservation status